Ambohimarina is a town and commune in northern Madagascar. It belongs to the district of Ambanja, which is a part of Diana Region. The population of the commune was estimated to be approximately 7,000 as of the 2001 census.

The majority (95%) of the population of the commune are farmers.  The most important crop is cocoa, while other important products are coffee and rice.  Services provide employment for 5% of the population.

References and notes 

Populated places in Diana Region